"Giants" is a song by Irish singer-songwriter and musician Dermot Kennedy. It was released as a digital download on 24 June 2020 by Riggins, Interscope and Island. The track peaked at Number 12 in the UK Chart and was the lead single from Dermot Kennedy's Number 1 Album (UK, Scottish and Irish Charts) 'Without Fear' and his only single on vinyl - released on a blue 7" in 2020.
 The song peaked at number one on the Irish Singles Chart. The song was written by Stephen Kozmeniuk, Scott Harris and Dermot Kennedy.

Background
In an interview with George Godfrey on Radio X, Kennedy said, "This is a song that I've had on me for a little while, but just the way things currently are things that have taken place in the world, it feels like there’s a massive shift taking place everywhere in the world so its meaning kind of grew and are and grew for me. And certainly now it feels like it’s a delicate time to release music right? You don't want to bring out something insipid and seem kind of tone deaf. You don't want people to think you're not thinking about things and so the meaning of the song […] It's ultimately just about being comfortable with letting go of the past and moving on and being comfortable with change and moving forward in that sense…"

Personnel
Credits adapted from Tidal.
 Stephen Kozmeniuk – producer, composer, lyricist, associated performer, bass, drums, guitar, keyboards
 Dermot Kennedy – composer, lyricist, associated performer, background vocalist, vocalist
 Scott Harris – composer, lyricist
 Ben Jones – associated performer, guitar
 Dave Cohen – associated performer, organ, piano
 Todd Clark – associated performer, background vocalist
 Matty Green – mixer, studio personnel
 Matt Snell – recording engineer, studio personnel

Charts

Weekly charts

Year-end charts

Certifications

Release history

References

2020 songs
2020 singles
Dermot Kennedy songs
Irish Singles Chart number-one singles
Songs written by Scott Harris (songwriter)
Songs written by Stephen Kozmeniuk
Interscope Records singles
Island Records singles
Songs written by Dermot Kennedy